The Washington Nationals' 2012 season was the eighth season for the baseball franchise of Major League Baseball in the District of Columbia, the fifth season at Nationals Park, and the 44th since the original team was started in Montreal, Quebec. After finishing the previous season in third place with an 80–81 record, out of last place in the NL East for the second time since moving to Washington, the Nationals made several moves to pursue playoff contention in 2012 and beyond. Despite being plagued with injuries, the Nationals had an impressive start to the season, never dropping below the .500 mark and consistently holding first or second place in their division. On September 3, the Nationals won their 82nd game of the season, making this season their first winning season since moving to Washington, D.C. in 2005 and the first for the franchise since 2003. On September 20, the Nationals beat the Los Angeles Dodgers to clinch the franchise's first postseason berth since 1981, and the first for a Washington-based team since the Washington Senators won the American League pennant in 1933. On October 1, the Nationals clinched the National League East division. On October 3, they went on to clinch the best record in Major League Baseball at 98–64. They played the St. Louis Cardinals in the Divisional Series, which they lost three games to two.

Offseason

Departures
On October 30, 2011, following the World Series, the Nationals granted Todd Coffey, Alex Cora, Jonny Gomes, Liván Hernández, Laynce Nix, and Iván Rodríguez free agency. On November 2, they also granted Luis Atilano, J.D. Martin, Shairon Martis, Garrett Mock, Óliver Pérez, Miguel Perez, Michael Aubrey, Matt Antonelli, Gregor Blanco, Buck Coats, and Jeff Frazier free agency. On November 3, Brian Bixler was selected off waivers by the Houston Astros, and on December 8, Erik Komatsu was selected by the St. Louis Cardinals in the Rule 5 draft (he was returned, via the Minnesota Twins, on May 29). On December 9, the Nationals traded Collin Balester to the Detroit Tigers for Ryan Perry. On December 12, Doug Slaten was granted free agency.

Additionally, on October 31, the Nationals moved interim bench coach Pat Corrales back into a position in player development for the team. Corrales had assumed that role in June after the resignations of manager Jim Riggleman and interim manager John McLaren — McLaren had held the bench coach position under Riggleman.

On December 23, the Nationals traded Brad Peacock and Tommy Milone, along with minor-league prospects Derek Norris and A. J. Cole, to the Oakland Athletics for left-handed starting pitcher Gio González and Oakland minor-league prospect Robert Gilliam.

On February 19, 2012, Mike Cameron (signed on December 19) retired after seventeen years in the major leagues, with one All-Star appearance and three Gold Glove awards.

On March 30, the Nationals granted Andrés Blanco (signed on December 16) free agency, and on April 2, the Nationals granted Chad Durbin (signed on February 1) free agency.

Arrivals

On December 5, 2011, the Nationals signed Brett Carroll as a free agent. On December 11, they signed Jason Michaels; they released him on March 29, 2012 and re-signed him to a new contract on April 2. On December 14 they signed Jarrett Hoffpauir and Waldis Joaquin, on December 15 they signed Jeff Fulchino, on December 20 they signed Xavier Paul and Chad Tracy, and on December 22 they signed Mark DeRosa.

On December 16 they signed Andrés Blanco, who they later released on March 30. On December 19, they signed Mike Cameron, who retired on February 19. On February 1, they signed Chad Durbin, who they later released on April 2.

On December 23, the Nationals traded Brad Peacock and Tommy Milone, along with minor-league prospects Derek Norris and A. J. Cole, to the Oakland Athletics for left-handed starting pitcher Gio González and Oakland minor-league prospect Robert Gilliam.

On January 4, 2012, the Nationals signed Dan Cortes, on January 26 they signed Brad Lidge, on February 2 they signed Edwin Jackson, on February 3 they signed Mitch Atkins, on February 6 they signed Mark Teahen, on February 28 they signed Mike Schultz, on March 18 they signed Xavier Nady, and on March 29 they signed Zach Duke.

Spring training
The Nationals held their 2012 spring training in Viera, Florida, with home games played at Space Coast Stadium.

Regular season
On April 3, 2012, the Nationals placed Drew Storen and Michael Morse on the disabled list to start the season, and John Lannan was optioned to Triple-A Syracuse. The Nationals also started a "Take Back Our Park" campaign vs. Philadelphia so Nationals fans in Maryland, Virginia, and Washington, D.C. could receive tickets for the series on May 4–6 in an advanced pre-sale. On April 28, 2012, top prospect Bryce Harper made his Major League debut vs. Los Angeles in Los Angeles, finishing with a double and a go-ahead sacrifice fly. The Nationals, however, would lose the game on a Matt Kemp walk-off home run in the bottom of the 10th inning.

At the All-Star break, which began on July 9, 2012, the Nationals were in first place in the NL East with a 49–34 record, four games ahead of the second-place Atlanta Braves.

On July 30, 2012, despite having an off day, the Nationals obtained the best record in baseball due to a loss by the Cincinnati Reds. This was the first time that a Washington baseball team held sole position of first place in MLB since 1933.

On September 20, 2012, the Nats clinched their first Playoff berth since moving to Washington, with a 4–1 win over the L.A. Dodgers.

On October 1, 2012, the Nats clinched the NL East when the Braves lost 2–1 to the Pirates.

The Nats finished the season on October 3, 2012, defeating the Phillies 5–1. They finished with a 98–64 record, the best record in Major League baseball that year. The Nationals played 20 extra inning games during the season, the most of any MLB team in 2012.

All-Star Game
Nationals starting pitchers Stephen Strasburg and Gio González, and shortstop Ian Desmond, were chosen to represent the Nationals in the 2012 All-Star Game. Desmond decided not to participate in order to rest a sore oblique muscle; Michael Bourn of the Atlanta Braves was chosen to go in his place. Giancarlo Stanton of the Miami Marlins declined to participate because of a serious knee injury which required surgery, so the Nationals' Bryce Harper was chosen to play in his place. This made the 19-year-old Harper the youngest position player and the third youngest player to be named an All-Star.

The Nationals therefore had four All-Stars, the most since they moved to Washington, D.C.

The game was played on Tuesday, July 10, in Kansas City, and the National League won, 8–0. Gonzalez and Strasburg each pitched one scoreless inning; Gonzalez struck out one batter, and Strasburg allowed a hit and a walk. Harper entered the game in the fifth inning as a pinch hitter and played the remainder of the game in left field; at the plate, he went 0–1 with a walk.

Season standings

Record vs. opponents

Opening Day lineup

Roster

Attendance
The Nationals drew 2,370,794 fans at Nationals Park during the regular season in 2012. It was the first time since 2006 that they had drawn more than 2,000,000 fans, and only the 2,731,993 they drew in their first season in Washington in 2005 exceeded it. It placed them ninth in attendance for the season among the 16 National League teams, also their best showing since 2005. Their highest attendance at a home game was on May 19, when they drew 42,331 for a game against the Baltimore Orioles, while their lowest was 14,520 for a game against the Houston Astros on April 18. Their average home attendance was 30,010 per game, second-highest since their arrival in Washington and the first time they had averaged over 30,000 a game since their first season in Washington in 2005.

Game log 

|-  style="text-align:center; background:#bfb;"
| 1 || April 5 || @ Cubs || 2–1 || Clippard (1–0) || Mármol (0–1) || Lidge (1) || 41,176 || 1–0 
|-  style="text-align:center; background:#bfb;"
| 2 || April 7 || @ Cubs || 7–4 || Mattheus (1–0) || Wood (0–1) || Rodríguez (1) || 40,102 || 2–0
|-  style="text-align:center; background:#fbb;"
| 3 || April 8 || @ Cubs || 3–4 || Samardzija (1–0) || Zimmermann (0–1) || Mármol (1) || 31,973 || 2–1 
|-  style="text-align:center; background:#fbb;"
| 4 || April 9 || @ Mets || 3–4 || Rauch (1–0) || Rodríguez (0–1) || || 23,970 || 2–2 
|-  style="text-align:center; background:#bfb;"
| 5 || April 10 || @ Mets || 6–2 || Detwiler (1–0) || Gee (0–1) || || 26,927 || 3–2 
|-  style="text-align:center; background:#bfb;"
| 6 || April 11 || @ Mets || 4–0 || Strasburg (1–0) || Santana (0–1) || || 34,614 || 4–2 
|-  style="text-align:center; background:#bfb;"
| 7 || April 12 || Reds || 3–2 (10) || Stammen (1–0) || Simón (0–1) || || 40,907 || 5–2 
|-  style="text-align:center; background:#bfb;"
| 8 || April 13 || Reds || 2–1 (13) || Stammen (2–0) || Marshall (0–1) || || 26,959 || 6–2 
|-  style="text-align:center; background:#bfb;"
| 9 || April 14 || Reds || 4–1 || Jackson (1–0) || Bailey (0–2) || ||35,489 || 7–2 
|-  style="text-align:center; background:#fbb;"
| 10 || April 15 || Reds || 5–8 (11) || Arredondo (1–0) || Clippard (1–1) || Marshall (1) || 25,679 || 7–3 
|-  style="text-align:center; background:#bfb;"
| 11 || April 16 || Astros || 6–3 || Strasburg (2–0) || Weiland (0–2) || Rodríguez (2) || 16,245 || 8–3 
|-  style="text-align:center; background:#bfb;"
| 12 || April 17 || Astros || 1–0 || Gonzalez (1–0) || W. Rodríguez (0-2) || Lidge (2) || 17,889 || 9-3
|-  style="text-align:center; background:#bfb;"
| 13 || April 18 || Astros || 3–2 || Mattheus (2–0) || F. Rodriguez (0–2) || Rodríguez (3) || 14,520 || 10-3 
|-  style="text-align:center; background:#fbb;"
| 14 || April 19 || Astros || 4–11 || Norris (1–0) || Jackson (1–1) || || 18,045 || 10–4 
|-  style="text-align:center; background:#bfb;"
| 15 || April 20 || Marlins || 2–0 || Detwiler (2–0) || Zambrano (0–1) || Rodríguez (4) || 24,640 || 11–4 
|-  style="text-align:center; background:#bfb;"
| 16 || April 21 || Marlins || 3–2 (10) || Gorzelanny (1–0) || Mujica (0–1) || || 26,745 || 12–4 
|-  style="text-align:center; background:#bbb;"
| - || April 22 || Marlins ||colspan=7|Game Postponed (rain) Rescheduled for August 3 as part of a doubleheader
|-  style="text-align:center; background:#bfb;"
| 17 || April 24 || @ Padres || 3–1 || Gonzalez (2–0) || Richard (1–2) || Rodríguez (5) || 16,599 || 13–4 
|-  style="text-align:center; background:#bfb;"
| 18 || April 25 || @ Padres || 7–2 || Zimmermann (1–1) || Wieland (0–3) || Gorzelanny (1) || 15,154 || 14–4 
|-  style="text-align:center; background:#fbb;"
| 19 || April 26 || @ Padres || 1–2 || Cashner (1–1) || Clippard (1–2) || Street (2) || 18,356 || 14–5
|-  style="text-align:center; background:#fbb;"
| 20 || April 27 || @ Dodgers || 2–3 || Kershaw (2–0) || Detwiler (2–1) || Jansen (1) || 44,807 || 14–6 
|-  style="text-align:center; background:#fbb;"
| 21 || April 28 || @ Dodgers || 3–4 (10) || Wright (1–0) || Gorzelanny (1–1) || || 54,242 || 14–7
|-  style="text-align:center; background:#fbb;"
| 22 || April 29 || @ Dodgers || 0–2 || Capuano (3–0) || Gonzalez (2–1) || Jansen (2) || 48,753 || 14–8 
|-

|-  style="text-align:center; background:#fbb;"
| 23 || May 1 || Diamondbacks || 1–5 || Cahill (2–2) || Zimmermann (1–2) || || 22,675 || 14–9
|-  style="text-align:center; background:#bfb;"
| 24 || May 2 || Diamondbacks || 5–4 || Rodríguez (1–1) || Putz (0–2) || || 16,274 || 15–9 
|-  style="text-align:center; background:#bfb;"
| 25 || May 3 || Diamondbacks || 2–1 || Detwiler (3–1) || Kennedy (3–1) || Rodríguez (6) || 19,656 || 16–9
|-  style="text-align:center; background:#bfb;"
| 26 || May 4 || Phillies || 4–3 (11) || Perry (1–0) || Schwimer (0–1) || || 34,377 || 17–9
|-  style="text-align:center; background:#bfb;"
| 27 || May 5 || Phillies || 7–1 || Gonzalez (3–1) || Worley (2–2) || || 39,496 || 18–9
|-  style="text-align:center; background:#fbb;"
| 28 || May 6 || Phillies || 3–9 || Hamels (4–1) || Zimmermann (1–3) || || 33,058 || 18–10
|-  style="text-align:center; background:#fbb;"
| 29 || May 8 || @ Pirates || 4–5 || Watson (2–0) || Rodríguez (1–2) || || 10,323 || 18–11
|-  style="text-align:center; background:#fbb;"
| 30 || May 9 || @ Pirates || 2–4 || Lincoln (2–0) || Detwiler (3–2) || Hanrahan (6) || 11,478 || 18–12
|-  style="text-align:center; background:#bfb;"
| 31 || May 10 || @ Pirates || 4–2 || Strasburg (3–0) || Correia (1–3) || Rodríguez (7) || 15,381 || 19–12
|-  style="text-align:center; background:#bfb;"
| 32 || May 11 || @ Reds || 7–3 || Gonzalez (4–1) || Leake (0–5) || || 37,255 || 20–12
|-  style="text-align:center; background:#bfb;"
| 33 || May 12 || @ Reds || 2–1 || Zimmermann (2–3) || Arredondo (2–1) || Rodríguez (8) || 42,294 || 21–12
|-  style="text-align:center; background:#fbb;"
| 34 || May 13 || @ Reds || 6–9 || Marshall (1–2) || Rodríguez (1–3) || || 28,361 || 21–13
|-  style="text-align:center; background:#bfb;"
| 35 || May 14 || Padres || 8–5 || Stammen (3–0) || Mikolas (0–1) || Burnett (1) || 19,434 || 22–13
|-  style="text-align:center; background:#fbb;"
| 36 || May 15 || Padres || 1–6 || Bass (2–4) || Strasburg (3–1) || || 23,902 || 22–14
|-  style="text-align:center; background:#bfb;"
| 37 || May 16 || Pirates || 7–4 || Gonzalez (5–1) || Bédard (2–5) || Rodríguez (9) || 25,942 || 23-14
|-  style="text-align:center; background:#fbb;"
| 38 || May 17 || Pirates || 3–5 || McDonald (3–2) || Zimmermann (2–4) || Hanrahan (8) || 25,757 || 23–15 
|-  style="text-align:center; background:#fbb;"
| 39 || May 18 || Orioles || 1–2 (11) || Gregg (2–1) || Mattheus (2–1) || Strop (3) || 36,680 || 23–16 
|-  style="text-align:center; background:#fbb;"
| 40 || May 19 || Orioles || 5–6 || Hammel (5–1) || Detwiler (3–3) || Johnson (15) || 42,331 || 23–17 
|-  style="text-align:center; background:#bfb;"
| 41 || May 20 || Orioles || 9–3 || Strasburg (4–1) || Chen (4–1) || || 41,918 || 24–17
|-  style="text-align:center; background:#bfb;"
| 42 || May 21 || @ Phillies || 2–1 || Gonzalez (6–1) || Kendrick (0–4) || Burnett (2) || 43,787 || 25–17
|-  style="text-align:center; background:#bfb;"
| 43 || May 22 || @ Phillies || 5–2 || Zimmermann (3–4) || Halladay (4–4) || Clippard (1) || 45,569 || 26–17
|-  style="text-align:center; background:#fbb;"
| 44 || May 23 || @ Phillies || 1–4 || Hamels (7–1) || Jackson (1–2) || || 43,926 || 26–18
|-  style="text-align:center; background:#bfb;"
| 45 || May 25 || @ Braves || 7–4 || Wang (1–0) || Hudson (3–2) || Clippard (2) || 37,663 || 27–18
|-  style="text-align:center; background:#bfb;"
| 46 || May 26 || @ Braves || 8–4 || Strasburg (5–1) || Medlen (1–1) || Clippard (3) || 42,698 || 28–18
|-  style="text-align:center; background:#bfb;"
| 47 || May 27 || @ Braves || 7–2 || Gonzalez (7–1) || Beachy (5–3) || || 38,543 || 29–18
|-  style="text-align:center; background:#fbb;"
| 48 || May 28 || @ Marlins || 3–5 || Zambrano (3–3) || Zimmermann (3–5) || Bell (8) || 31,528 || 29–19
|-  style="text-align:center; background:#fbb;"
| 49 || May 29 || @ Marlins || 1–3 || Sánchez (3–3) || Jackson (1–3) || Bell (9) || 25,969 || 29–20
|-  style="text-align:center; background:#fbb;"
| 50 || May 30 || @ Marlins || 3–5 || Johnson (3–3) || Wang (1–1) || Bell (10) || 24,224 || 29–21
|-

|-  style="text-align:center; background:#bbb;"
| - || June 1 || Braves ||colspan=7|Game Postponed (rain) Rescheduled for July 21 as part of a doubleheader
|-  style="text-align:center; background:#bfb;"
| 51 || June 2 || Braves || 2–0 || Strasburg (6–1) || Beachy (5–4) || Clippard (4) || 41,042 || 30–21
|-  style="text-align:center; background:#fbb;"
| 52 || June 3 || Braves || 2–3 || Hanson (6–4) || Gonzalez (7–2) || Kimbrel (16) || 38,046 || 30–22
|-  style="text-align:center; background:#bfb;"
| 53 || June 5 || Mets || 7–6 (12) || Detwiler (4–3) || Ramírez (0–1) || || 26,256 || 31–22
|-  style="text-align:center; background:#bfb;"
| 54 || June 6 || Mets || 5–3 || Jackson (2–3) || Hefner (1–3) || Clippard (5) || 27,335 || 32–22
|-  style="text-align:center; background:#fbb;"
| 55 || June 7 || Mets || 1–3 || Dickey (9–1) || Wang (1–2) || Francisco (15) || 32,096 || 32–23 
|-  style="text-align:center; background:#bfb;"
| 56 || June 8 || @ Red Sox || 7–4 || Strasburg (7–1) || Doubront (6–3) || Clippard (6) || 37,309 || 33–23
|-  style="text-align:center; background:#bfb;"
| 57 || June 9 || @ Red Sox || 4–2 || Gonzalez (8–2) || Matsuzaka (0–1) || Clippard (7) || 37,534 || 34–23
|-  style="text-align:center; background:#bfb;"
| 58 || June 10 || @ Red Sox || 4–3 || Gorzelanny (2–1) || Aceves (0–4) || Clippard (8) || 37,467 || 35–23
|-  style="text-align:center; background:#bfb;"
| 59 || June 11 || @ Blue Jays || 6–3 || Jackson (3–3) || Morrow (7–4) || || 18,513 || 36–23
|-  style="text-align:center; background:#bfb;"
| 60 || June 12 || @ Blue Jays || 4–2 || Wang (2–2) || Álvarez (3–6) || Clippard (9) || 22,538 || 37–23
|-  style="text-align:center; background:#bfb;"
| 61 || June 13 || @ Blue Jays || 6–2 || Strasburg (8–1) || Drabek (4–7) || || 41,667 || 38–23
|-  style="text-align:center; background:#fbb;"
| 62 || June 15 || Yankees || 2–7 || Hughes (7–5) || Gonzalez (8–3) || || 41,406 || 38–24
|-  style="text-align:center; background:#fbb;"
| 63 || June 16 || Yankees || 3–5 (14) || García (1–2)  || Lidge (0–1) || Soriano (12)  || 41,287 || 38–25 
|-  style="text-align:center; background:#fbb;"
| 64 || June 17 || Yankees || 1–4 || Nova (9–2) || Jackson (3–4) || Soriano (13) || 41,442 || 38–26
|-  style="text-align:center; background:#fbb;"
| 65 || June 19 || Rays || 4–5 || Price (9–4) || Wang (2–3) || Rodney (20) || 27,835 || 38–27
|-  style="text-align:center; background:#bfb;"
| 66 || June 20 || Rays || 3–2 || Strasburg (9–1) || Archer (0–1) || Clippard (10) || 27,485 || 39–27
|-  style="text-align:center; background:#bfb;"
| 67 || June 21 || Rays || 5–2 || Gonzalez (9–3) || Peralta (0–3) || Clippard (11) || 29,551 || 40–27
|-  style="text-align:center; background:#fbb;"
| 68 || June 22 || @ Orioles || 1–2 || Hammel (8–2) || Zimmermann (3–6) || Johnson (21) || 45,891 || 40–28
|-  style="text-align:center; background:#bfb;"
| 69 || June 23 || @ Orioles || 3–1 || Jackson (4–4) || Chen (7–3) || Clippard (12) || 46,298 || 41–28
|-  style="text-align:center; background:#fbb;"
| 70 || June 24 || @ Orioles || 1–2 || Strop (4–2) || Burnett (0–1) || Johnson (22) || 41,794 || 41–29
|-  style="text-align:center; background:#fbb;"
| 71 || June 25 || @ Rockies || 2–4 || Roenicke (3–0) || Strasburg (9–2) || Betancourt (12) || 40,177 || 41–30
|-  style="text-align:center; background:#bfb;"
| 72 || June 26 || @ Rockies || 12–5 || Gonzalez (10–3) || Friedrich (4–5) || || 36,110 || 42–30
|-  style="text-align:center; background:#bfb;"
| 73 || June 27 || @ Rockies || 11–5 || Zimmermann (4–6) || Cabrera (0–1) || || 36,045 || 43–30
|-  style="text-align:center; background:#fbb;"
| 74 || June 28 || @ Rockies || 10–11 (11) || Ottavino (2–0) || Stammen (3–1) || || 33,957 || 43–31 
|-  style="text-align:center; background:#bfb;"
| 75 || June 29 || @ Braves || 5–4 || Burnett (1–1) || Durbin (3–1) || Clippard (13) || 32,299 || 44–31
|-  style="text-align:center; background:#fbb;"
| 76 || June 30 || @ Braves || 5–7 || Minor (4–6) || Strasburg (9–3) || Kimbrel (23) || 26,491 || 44–32
|-

|-  style="text-align:center; background:#bfb;"
| 77 || July 1 || @ Braves || 8–4 || Gonzalez (11–3) || Hudson (6–4) || || 18,796 || 45–32
|-  style="text-align:center; background:#bfb;"
| 78 || July 3 || Giants || 9–3 || Zimmermann (5–6) || Lincecum (3–9) || || 36,985 || 46–32
|-  style="text-align:center; background:#bfb;"
| 79 || July 4 || Giants || 9–4 || Jackson (5–4) || Bumgarner (10–5) || || 35,806 || 47–32
|-  style="text-align:center; background:#bfb;"
| 80 || July 5 || Giants || 6–5 || Clippard (2–2) || Casilla (2–4) || || 29,819 || 48–32
|-  style="text-align:center; background:#fbb;"
| 81 || July 6 || Rockies || 1–5 || Pomeranz (1–3) || Strasburg (9–4) || Betancourt (14) || 28,951 || 48–33
|-  style="text-align:center; background:#bfb;"
| 82 || July 7 || Rockies || 4–1 || Gonzalez (12–3) || Francis (2–2) || Clippard (14) || 28,032 || 49–33
|-  style="text-align:center; background:#fbb;"
| 83 || July 8 || Rockies || 3–4 || Brothers (4–2) || Clippard (2–3) || Betancourt (15) || 25,125 || 49–34
|- style="text-align:center; background:#bbb;"
|colspan=9| All–Star Break (July 9–12)
|-  style="text-align:center; background:#bfb;"
| 84 || July 13 || @ Marlins || 5–1 || Zimmermann (6–6) || Johnson (5–6) || || 30,911 || 50–34
|-  style="text-align:center; background:#fbb;"
| 85 || July 14 || @ Marlins || 1–2 || Buehrle (9–8) || Gonzalez (12–4) || Cishek (2) || 28,707 || 50–35
|-  style="text-align:center; background:#bfb;"
| 86 || July 15 || @ Marlins || 4–0 || Strasburg (10–4) || Nolasco (8–7) || || 29,889 || 51–35
|-  style="text-align:center; background:#fbb;"
| 87 || July 16 || @ Marlins || 3–5 || Zambrano (5–7) || Jackson (5–5) || Dunn (1) || 29,248 || 51–36
|-  style="text-align:center; background:#bfb;"
| 88 || July 17 || Mets || 5–4 (10) || Mattheus (3–1) || Byrdak (2–1) || || 26,342 || 52–36
|-  style="text-align:center; background:#bfb;"
| 89 || July 18 || Mets || 4–3 || Zimmermann (7–6) || Young (2–4) || Clippard (15) || 31,660 || 53–36
|-  style="text-align:center; background:#fbb;"
| 90 || July 19 || Mets || 5–9 || Dickey (13–1) || Gonzalez (12–5) || || 36,389 || 53–37
|-  style="text-align:center; background:#fbb;"
| 91 || July 20 || Braves || 10–11 (11) || O'Flaherty (2–0) || Gorzelanny (2–2) || Durbin (1) || 34,228 || 53–38
|-  style="text-align:center; background:#fbb;"
| 92 || July 21 (1) || Braves || 0–4 || Sheets (2–0) || Jackson (5–6) || || 28,745 || 53–39
|-  style="text-align:center; background:#bfb;"
| 93 || July 21 (2) || Braves || 5–2 || Lannan (1–0) || Martínez (4–2) || Clippard (16) || 40,047 || 54–39
|-  style="text-align:center; background:#bfb;"
| 94 || July 22 || Braves || 9–2 || Detwiler (5–3) || Jurrjens (3–4) || || 34,917 || 55–39
|-  style="text-align:center; background:#bfb;"
| 95 || July 23 || @ Mets || 8–2 (10) || Gorzelanny (3–2) || Byrdak (2–2) || || 26,735 || 56–39
|-  style="text-align:center; background:#bfb;"
| 96 || July 24 || @ Mets || 5–2 || Gonzalez (13–5) || Dickey (13–2) || Clippard (17) || 36,236 || 57–39
|-  style="text-align:center; background:#bfb;"
| 97 || July 25 || @ Mets || 5–2 || Strasburg (11–4) || Hefner (1–4) || Clippard (18) || 35,517 || 58–39
|-  style="text-align:center; background:#bfb;"
| 98 || July 26 || @ Brewers || 8–2 || Jackson (6–6) || Gallardo (8–8) || || 33,176 || 59–39 
|-  style="text-align:center; background:#fbb;"
| 99 || July 27 || @ Brewers || 0–6 || Fiers (4–4) || Detwiler (5–4) || || 35,858 || 59–40
|-  style="text-align:center; background:#bfb;"
| 100 || July 28 || @ Brewers || 4–1 || Zimmermann (8–6) || Wolf (3–7) || Clippard (19) || 41,890 || 60–40
|-  style="text-align:center; background:#bfb;"
| 101 || July 29 || @ Brewers || 11–10 (11) || Stammen (4–1) || Veras (3–4) || Clippard (20) || 44,663 || 61–40
|-  style="text-align:center; background:#fbb;"
| 102 || July 31 || Phillies || 0–8 || Lee (2–6) || Strasburg (11–5) ||  || 30,167 || 61–41 
|-

|-  style="text-align:center; background:#fbb;"
| 103 || August 1 || Phillies || 2–3 || Worley (6–6) || Jackson (6–7) || Papelbon (23) || 23,777 || 61–42 
|-  style="text-align:center; background:#bfb;"
| 104 || August 2 || Phillies || 3–0 || Detwiler (6–4) || Hamels (11–6) || Clippard (21) || 28,825 || 62–42
|-  style="text-align:center; background:#bfb;"
| 105 || August 3 (1) || Marlins || 7–4 || Lannan (2–0) || Hand (0–1) || Clippard (22) ||rowspan=2| 32,334 || 63–42 
|-  style="text-align:center; background:#fbb;"
| 106 || August 3 (2) || Marlins || 2–5 || Johnson (7–7) || Gonzalez (13–6) || Cishek (6) || 63–43
|-  style="text-align:center; background:#bfb;"
| 107 || August 4 || Marlins || 10–7 || Mattheus (4–1) || Dunn (0–1) || || 33,449 || 64–43
|-  style="text-align:center; background:#bfb;"
| 108 || August 5 || Marlins || 4–1 || Strasburg (12–5) || Nolasco (8–11) || Storen (1) || 30,453 || 65–43
|-  style="text-align:center; background:#bfb;"
| 109 || August 6 || @ Astros || 5–4 (11) || Stammen (5–1) || López (3–1) || || 13,843 || 66–43
|-  style="text-align:center; background:#bfb;"
| 110 || August 7 || @ Astros || 3–2 (12) || Storen (1–0) || Storey (0–1) || Clippard (23) || 14,273 || 67–43
|-  style="text-align:center; background:#bfb;"
| 111 || August 8 || @ Astros || 4–3 || Gonzalez (14–6) || Galarraga (0–2) || || 16,038 || 68–43
|-  style="text-align:center; background:#bfb;"
| 112 || August 9 || @ Astros || 5–0 || Zimmermann (9–6) || Harrell (9–8) || || 14,417 || 69–43
|-  style="text-align:center; background:#bfb;"
| 113 || August 10 || @ Diamondbacks || 9–1 || Strasburg (13–5) || Cahill (9–10) || || 29,362 || 70–43
|-  style="text-align:center; background:#bfb;"
| 114 || August 11 || @ Diamondbacks || 6–5 || Jackson (7–7) || Miley (12–8) || Clippard (24) || 34,030 || 71–43
|-  style="text-align:center; background:#fbb;"
| 115 || August 12 || @ Diamondbacks || 4–7 || Corbin (4–4) || Detwiler (6–5) || Putz (22) || 27,345 || 71–44
|-  style="text-align:center; background:#bfb;"
| 116 || August 13 || @ Giants || 14–2 || Gonzalez (15–6) || Vogelsong (10–6) || || 42,050 || 72–44
|-  style="text-align:center; background:#fbb;"
| 117 || August 14 || @ Giants || 1–6 || Bumgarner (13–7) || Zimmermann (9–7) || || 42,081 || 72–45
|-  style="text-align:center; background:#bfb;"
| 118 || August 15 || @ Giants || 6–4 || Strasburg (14–5) || Lincecum (6–13) || Clippard (25) || 42,133 || 73–45
|-  style="text-align:center; background:#bfb;"
| 119 || August 17 || Mets || 6–4 || Detwiler (7–5) || Santana (6–9) || Clippard (26) || 34,827 || 74–45
|-  style="text-align:center; background:#fbb;"
| 120 || August 18 || Mets || 0–2 || Niese (10–6) || Jackson (7–8) || Francisco (20) || 42,662 || 74–46
|-  style="text-align:center; background:#bfb;"
| 121 || August 19 || Mets || 5–2 || Gonzalez (16–6) || Hefner (2–5) || Clippard (27) || 33,764 || 75–46
|-  style="text-align:center; background:#bfb;"
| 122 || August 20 || Braves || 5–4 (13) || Stammen (6–1) || Martínez (5–3) || || 21,298 || 76–46
|-  style="text-align:center; background:#bfb;"
| 123 || August 21 || Braves || 4–1 || Strasburg (15–5) || Maholm (11–8) || Clippard (28) || 33,888 || 77–46
|-  style="text-align:center; background:#fbb;"
| 124 || August 22 || Braves || 1–5 || Medlen (5–1) || Detwiler (7–6) || || 29,111 || 77–47
|-  style="text-align:center; background:#fbb;"
| 125 || August 24 || @ Phillies ||2–4 || Kendrick (7–9) || Jackson (7–9) || Papelbon (28) || 42,096 || 77–48
|-  style="text-align:center; background:#fbb;"
| 126 || August 25 || @ Phillies || 2–4 || Halladay (8–7) || Gonzalez (16–7) || Papelbon (29) || 44,256 || 77–49 
|-  style="text-align:center; background:#fbb;"
| 127 || August 26 || @ Phillies || 1–4 || Lee (3–7) || Zimmerman (9–8) || Lindblom (1) || 44,653 || 77–50
|-  style="text-align:center; background:#fbb;"
| 128 || August 28 || @ Marlins || 0–9 || Nolasco (10–12) || Strasburg (15–6) || || 24,877 || 77–51
|-  style="text-align:center; background:#bfb;"
| 129 || August 29 || @ Marlins || 8–4 || Detwiler (8–6) || Turner (1–3) || || 24,909 || 78–51
|-  style="text-align:center; background:#bfb;"
| 130 || August 30 || Cardinals || 8–1 || Jackson (8–9) || García (3–6) || || 23,269 || 79–51 
|-  style="text-align:center; background:#bfb;"
| 131 || August 31 || Cardinals || 10–0 || Gonzalez (17–7) || Wainwright (13–11) || || 29,499 || 80–51 
|-

|-  style="text-align:center; background:#fbb;"
| 132 || September 1 || Cardinals || 9–10 || Boggs (3–1) || Storen (1–1) || Motte (32) || 34,004 || 80–52 
|-  style="text-align:center; background:#bfb;"
| 133 || September 2 || Cardinals || 4–3 || Mattheus (5–1) || Lynn (13–6) || Clippard (29) || 31,096 || 81–52 
|-  style="text-align:center; background:#bfb;"
| 134 || September 3 || Cubs || 2–1 || Detwiler (9–6) || Samardzija (8–13) || Clippard (30) || 23,215 || 82–52 
|-  style="text-align:center; background:#bfb;"
| 135 || September 4 || Cubs || 11–5 || Jackson (9–9) || Rusin (0–2) || || 17,648 || 83–52 
|-  style="text-align:center; background:#bfb;"
| 136 || September 5 || Cubs || 9–1 || Gonzalez (18–7) || Volstad (2–10) || || 21,244 || 84–52
|-  style="text-align:center; background:#bfb;"
| 137 || September 6 || Cubs || 9–2 || Zimmerman (10–8) || Germano (2–6) || || 22,447 || 85–52
|-  style="text-align:center; background:#fbb;"
| 138 || September 7 || Marlins || 7–9 (10) || Gaudin (3–1) || Clippard (2–4) || Cishek (13) || 28,533 || 85–53
|-  style="text-align:center; background:#bfb;"
| 139 || September 8 || Marlins || 7–6 (10) || Storen (2–1) || Gaudin (3–2) || || 28,860 || 86–53
|-  style="text-align:center; background:#fbb;"
| 140 || September 9 || Marlins || 0–8 || Nolasco (12–12) || Jackson (9–10) || || 24,396 || 86–54
|-  style="text-align:center; background:#bfb;"
| 141 || September 10 || @ Mets || 5–1 || Gonzalez (19–7) || McHugh (0–2) || || 21,923 || 87–54
|-  style="text-align:center; background:#bfb;"
| 142 || September 11 || @ Mets || 5–3 || Gorzelanny (4–2) || Dickey (18–5) || Clippard (31) || 22,596 || 88–54
|-  style="text-align:center; background:#bfb;"
| 143 || September 12 || @ Mets || 2–0 || Lannan (3–0) || Harvey (3–5) || Storen (2) || 21,205 || 89–54
|-  style="text-align:center; background:#fbb;"
| 144 || September 14 || @ Braves || 1–2 || Kimbrel (2–1) || Burnett (1–2) || || 41,797 || 89–55
|-  style="text-align:center; background:#fbb;"
| 145 || September 15 || @ Braves || 4–5 || O'Flaherty (3–0) || Mattheus (5–2) || Kimbrel (36) || 38,763 || 89–56
|-  style="text-align:center; background:#fbb;"
| 146 || September 16 || @ Braves || 1–5 || Minor (9–10) || Gonzalez (19–8) || || 29,094 || 89–57 
|-  style="text-align:center; background:#bbb;"
| - || September 18 || Dodgers ||colspan=7|Game Postponed (rain) Rescheduled for September 19 as part of a doubleheader
|-  style="text-align:center; background:#bfb;"
| 147 || September 19 (1) || Dodgers || 3–1 || Zimmerman (11–8) || Harang (9–10) || Clippard (32) ||rowspan=2| 26,931 || 90–57
|-  style="text-align:center; background:#fbb;"
| 148 || September 19 (2) || Dodgers || 6–7 || Belisario (7–1) || Clippard (2–5) || League (12) || 90–58
|-  style="text-align:center; background:#bfb;"
| 149 || September 20 || Dodgers || 4–1 || Detwiler (10–6) || Capuano (11–11) || Storen (3) || 30,359 || 91–58 
|-  style="text-align:center; background:#fbb;"
| 150 || September 21 || Brewers || 2–4 || Veras (5–4) || Clippard (2–6) || Axford (32) || 30,382 || 91–59 
|-  style="text-align:center; background:#bfb;"
| 151 || September 22 || Brewers || 10–4 || Gonzalez (20–8) || Peralta (2–1) || || 40,493 ||  92–59
|-  style="text-align:center; background:#fbb;"
| 152 || September 23 || Brewers || 2–6 || Kintzler (3–0) || Mattheus (5–3) || Axford (33) || 33,111 || 92–60
|-  style="text-align:center; background:#bfb;"
| 153 || September 24 || Brewers || 12–2 || Zimmerman (12–8) || Estrada (4–7) || || 25,302 || 93–60
|-  style="text-align:center; background:#fbb;"
| 154 || September 25 || @ Phillies || 3–6 || Hamels (16–6) || Detwiler (10–7) || Papelbon (37) || 42,304 || 93–61
|-  style="text-align:center; background:#bfb;"
| 155 || September 26 || @ Phillies || 8–4 || Lannan (4–0) || Kendrick (10–12) || || 41,440 || 94–61
|-  style="text-align:center; background:#bfb;"
| 156 || September 27 || @ Phillies || 7–3 || Gonzalez (21–8) || Cloyd (2–2) || || 44,070 || 95–61
|-  style="text-align:center; background:#fbb;"
| 157 || September 28 || @ Cardinals || 2–12 || Wainwright (14–13) || Jackson (9–11) || || 39,166 || 95–62
|-  style="text-align:center; background:#bfb;"
| 158 || September 29 || @ Cardinals || 6–4 (10) || Storen (3–1) || Freeman (0–2) || Stammen (1) || 42,264 || 96–62 
|-  style="text-align:center; background:#fbb;"
| 159 || September 30 || @ Cardinals || 4–10 || Lynn (18–7) || Detwiler (10–8) || || 40,084 ||  96–63
|-

|-  style="text-align:center; background:#fbb;"
| 160 || October 1 || Phillies || 0–2 || Kendrick (11–12) || Lannan (4–1) || Aumont (2) || 35,387 || 96–64
|-  style="text-align:center; background:#bfb;"
| 161 || October 2 || Phillies || 4–2 || Duke (1–0) || Lindblom (3–5) || Storen (4) || 33,546 || 97–64
|-  style="text-align:center; background:#bfb;"
| 162 || October 3 || Phillies || 5–1 || Jackson (10–11) || Lee (6–9) || || 37,075 || 98–64
|-

Postseason

Postseason game log

|-align="center" bgcolor="bbffbb"
| 1 || October 7 || @ Cardinals || 3–2 ||  Mattheus (1–0) || Boggs (0–1) || Storen (1) || 47,078 || 1–0
|-align="center" bgcolor="ffbbbb"
| 2 || October 8 || @ Cardinals || 4–12 ||  Lynn (1–0) || Zimmermann (0–1) || || 45,840 || 1–1
|-align="center" bgcolor="ffbbbb"
| 3 || October 10 || Cardinals || 0–8 ||  Carpenter (1–0) || Jackson (0–1) || || 45,017 || 1–2
|-align="center" bgcolor="bbffbb"
| 4 || October 11 || Cardinals || 2–1 ||  Storen (1–0) || Lynn  (1–1) || || 44,392 || 2–2
|-align="center" bgcolor="ffbbbb"
| 5 || October 12 || Cardinals || 7–9 ||  Motte (1–0) || Storen (1–1) || || 45,966|| 2–3
|-

Division Series

The Nationals played the St. Louis Cardinals in the Division Series. The Cardinals won the series, 3 games to 2.

Game 1, October 7
3:07 p.m. (EDT) at Busch Stadium in St. Louis, Missouri

Game 2, October 8
4:37 p.m. (EDT) at Busch Stadium in St. Louis, Missouri

Game 3, October 10
1:07 p.m. (EDT) at Nationals Park in Washington, D.C.

Game 4, October 11
4:07 p.m. (EDT) at Nationals Park in Washington, D.C.

Game 5, October 12
8:37 p.m. (EDT) at Nationals Park in Washington, D.C.

Player statistics

Regular season

Both tables are sortable.

Batting
Note: POS = Position; G = Games played; AB = At bats; R = Runs scored; H = Hits; 2B = Doubles; 3B = Triples; HR = Home runs; RBI = Runs batted in; AVG = Batting average; SB = Stolen bases

Complete offensive statistics are available here.

Pitching
Note: POS = Position; G = Games played; GS = Games started; IP = Innings pitched; W = Wins; L = Losses; SV = Saves; HLD = Holds; ERA = Earned run average; SO = Strikeouts; WHIP = Walks and hits per inning pitched

Complete pitching statistics are available here.

Team leaders

Qualifying players only.

Batting

Pitching

Postseason

Both tables are sortable.

Batting
Note: POS = Position; G = Games played; AB = At bats; R = Runs scored; H = Hits; 2B = Doubles; 3B = Triples; HR = Home runs; RBI = Runs batted in; AVG = Batting average; SB = Stolen bases

Complete offensive statistics can be found here.

Pitching
Note: POS = Position; G = Games played; GS = Games Started IP = Innings pitched; W = Wins; L = Losses; SV = Saves; HLD = Holds; ERA = Earned run average; SO= Strikeouts; WHIP = Walks and hits per inning pitched

Complete pitching statistics can be found here.

Awards and honors

All-Stars
 Ian Desmond, SS
 Gio González, P
 Bryce Harper, OF
 Stephen Strasburg, P

Ian Desmond did not participate in the 2012 Major League Baseball All-Star Game due to injury.

Annual awards
 National League Manager of the Year: Davey Johnson
 National League Rookie of the Year: Bryce Harper
 Gold Glove: Adam LaRoche, 1B
 Silver Slugger: Adam LaRoche, 1B; Ian Desmond, SS; Stephen Strasburg, P

Farm system

Notes

References

External links

 2012 Washington Nationals Season Official Site
 2012 Washington Nationals season at Baseball Reference

Washington Nationals seasons
Washington Nationals
National League East champion seasons
Washington Nationals